Eli Verschleiser is an American businessman from New York City.

Real Estate & Career
Verschleiser is a founding partner and Chairman of the Multi Group of Companies. Verschleiser was also the founder and President of the United Realty Trust, along with his ex-partner Jacob Frydman. In addition to that, he and his former partner founded United Realty Partners. Verschleiser later resigned and sued Frydman for allegedly illegally moving investor funds into his own account. He and his ex-partner Jacob Frydman have been embroiled in series of lawsuits over control of the company.

Philanthropy

Verschleiser is known to serve on the board of The American Jewish Congress, he is a Co-Founder & President for Our Place (Foundation), a non-profit organization that provides support, for troubled Jewish youth. He also serves on the board of advisors for Magenu, an organization he helped create to educate children in personal safety topics.

References

External links 
American Jewish Congress

1974 births
Living people
American Orthodox Jews
American real estate businesspeople
Businesspeople from New York City